Kwerisa, or Taogwe, is a nearly extinct Lakes Plain language of Irian Jaya, Indonesia. Most of the Kwerisa people have shifted to Kaiy, which is closely related.

References

Lakes Plain languages
Languages of western New Guinea
Endangered Papuan languages